Top Gear Rally, known in Japan as Top Gear Rally SP, is a racing video game developed by Tantalus Interactive and released for the Game Boy Advance in 2003.

Gameplay
Top Gear Rally is a racing game where the player drives rally cars through a series of courses. It also features a multiplayer mode where two players can compete against each other with the use of the Game Boy Advance Game Link Cable.

Development
Top Gear Rally was developed by the Australian company Tantalus Interactive. Its cars were designed as full 3D models. The game was presented at the Electronic Entertainment Expo in May 2003.

Reception

Top Gear Rally received generally favorable reviews from publications. GameSpot praised its graphics very positively, comparing their quality to that of PlayStation games.

Tantalus won Best Game at the 2003 Australian Game Developer Awards in Melbourne for its work on the game.

References

External links

Top Gear (video game series)
2003 video games
Kemco games
Game Boy Advance games
Game Boy Advance-only games
Off-road racing video games
Video games developed in Australia
Tantalus Media games
Multiplayer and single-player video games